Sheikh Maqbool Orakzai, known as Shahidullah Shahid and later as Abu Umar Maqbool al Khurasani, was a Pakistani Islamic militant who served in senior roles in both the Tehrik-i-Taliban Pakistan and in the Islamic State's province in Afghanistan and Pakistan.

History

Tehrik-i-Taliban Pakistan

Shahid served as a top spokesman for the Pakistani Taliban since the group was formed in 2006.

Islamic State
On 21 October 2014 he was sacked by the Pakistani Taliban for his pledge of allegiance to Abu Bakr al-Baghdadi and the Islamic State, which he had made a week prior.

Death
On 9 July 2015, he was killed in an American airstrike in Dih Bala District, Nangarhar Province, Afghanistan. Gul Zaman, a militant commander from Pakistan’s Orakzai tribal region, was also killed in the strike.

References

Islamic State of Iraq and the Levant members
Tehrik-i-Taliban Pakistan members
2015 deaths
Year of birth missing
Pashtun people
Pakistani Islamists
Salafi jihadists
Deaths by United States drone strikes in Pakistan